The California Firearm Violence Research Center is a forthcoming research center the California legislature approved to fund on June 16, 2016. The center will live within the University of California and will be the first publicly charted center in the United States. Garen Wintemute and Senator Lois Wolk led the proposal to create the center. With access to California's gun violence data, the center will investigate policy efficacy, links between gun violence and alcohol abuse, and more. California's annual death rate related to gun violence has dropped 20% since 2000, despite an unchanged national rate. This center hopes to determine whether other states can replicate this outcome, as research may surface factors that led to the decline. The UC system will finalize details in the summer of 2016 to start recruiting scientists for its research projects. The National Rifle Association opposed the inclusion of the center, as they have lobbied for decades against federal and taxpayer money researching gun violence. Several bills have been turned down in Congress due to a lack of data on the impact of gun violence on public health, and the center's founders hope to provide necessary data to advance legislation.

References 

Research institutes in California
Gun violence in the United States
University of California
2016 in California